Naya Sansar ("New World") is a 1941 Indian Hindustani-language film on radical journalism, directed by reporter turned director, N. R. Acharya (1909–1993), and written by a journalist himself, Khwaja Ahmad Abbas, who started his film career with this film. It won him the Bengal Film Journalists' Association Award for the best story and screenplay.

It features dialogues by Shaheed Latif and J. S. Kashyap; and  stars Renuka Devi (1918–1989) and Ashok Kumar in the lead roles.This film later inspired Khwaja Ahmad Abbas to name his production house as "Naya Sansar" Productions

Overview
The film was written by Abbas, who was a film critic at that time. He used his journalistic background to create a story about the rising radicalism in Indian society and journalism. The story addressed the conflict between a dynamic young reporter and his cautious, yet idealistic, editor of the fictional progressive newspaper, 'Sansar'. The story line revolved around the editor, Premchand (Mubarak), who is in love with a beautiful orphan named Asha (Renuka Devi), whom his family has raised from an infant.  Soon after Asha starts working for the paper, she falls in love with Sansar's star reporter and dedicated radical-journalist, Puran (Ashok Kumar). Asha, however, still feels indebted to Premchand's family.

When Premchand starts to hedge on his radicalism by dealing with the evil Dhaniram, Puran quits, and starts his own newspaper, "Naya Sansar".  Premchand quickly sees the error of his ways, and not only returns to the paper's previous left-wing stance, but also condones the marriage of Asha and Puran.

Cast

Credits adapted from the film's pressbook:
 Renuka Devi as Asha 
 Ashok Kumar as Karanpriya
 Mubarak as Prem Chand
 Shahnawaz as Shamsher Singh
 V. H. Desai as Chacha
 Jagannathas Dhaniram
 David as Mr. Sharma
 Suresh as Bhola
 P. F. Pithawala as Kallu				
 Azurie as Zarinah

Songs
 Mera Mann Kho Gaya; singer: Ashok Kumar.
Mai Harijan Ki Chori ; singer: Rajkumari Dubey, Arun Kumar

Awards
 1942: BFJA Awards: Best Screenplay: KA Abbas

References

External links
 

1940s Hindi-language films
Films about journalists
Films with screenplays by Khwaja Ahmad Abbas
1940s Urdu-language films
Indian black-and-white films
Indian drama films
1941 drama films
1941 films
Hindi-language drama films
Urdu-language Indian films